Leon Recanati (born May 10, 1948) is an Israeli businessman and philanthropist.

Biography
Leon Recanati is the son of Mathilda and Daniel Recanati. His father served as CEO of the Israel Discount Bank and along with his brothers, established the IDB Holding Corporation. After completing his military service, Recanati earned a B.A. in economics and an M.B.A. at Hebrew University in Jerusalem. Leon Recanati is married to artist Mira Recanati. They have two children, Daniel and Dafna who is married to American philanthropist and investor Thomas Kaplan. Recanati has a younger daughter May from a past relationship with Shula Recanati.

Business career
In 1971, he worked for the Israel Discount Bank – which was founded by his grandfather, Leon Yehuda Recanati. In 1979, he was appointed deputy CEO with responsibility for all branches and marketing. He largely escaped the scandal of the 1983 Israel bank stock crisis.  In 1986, he transferred to IDB Holding, the investment side of the family business where he rotated through various chairmanships at Supersol, Delek and Clal, and later served as co-CEO and co-chairman of IDB Holding.

In May 2003, the family sold IDB Holding to Nochi Dankner and divided its assets. With his share, Recanati established Glenrock, an investment company,  which he ran with his wife Shula Recanati and Ziv Kop. It has three divisions: GlenRock America assists Israeli businesses in entering the American market and also serves as a conduit for American investors to invest in Israel (headed by Larry Graev); GlenRock Israel invests in local technology companies; and GlenRock Italy advises Israeli businesses in penetrating the Italian market and serves as a bridge for Italian investors interested in investing in Israel (headed by Rony Benatof).

In 2007, he purchased a 50.4% stake (73% total with two minority partners) in the Gmul Investment Company for NIS 600 million more than twice its market capitalization. Gmul had stakes in real estate, hotels, investments, and automotive. It was founded in 1950 by Bank Hapoalim, the Histadrut labor federation and several pension funds then sold to the brothers Jules and Eddy Trump, who listed it on the Tel Aviv Stock Exchange, and then sold in October 2003 to Eyal Yona and Amnon Barzilay. Performance at Gmul deteriorated. Recanati stated: "At this point I can say that buying control of Gmul was the worst deal I have ever made... I cannot invest any more in Gmul, but I hope that we can all work together to find a solution and reach a fair, mutually agreed-upon arrangement." In October 2011, he sold half of his 50.4% investment in Gmul to Itzhak Gvilli for NIS 20 million. He resigned as chairman of Gmul in July 2012.

Philanthropy
Recanati serves as vice chairman of the Israel Cancer Association. He has served as chairman of Tel Aviv University's Development Committee and he also is involved with the Israel Museum and the Tel Aviv Museum. Recanati established the Tapuah program in Israel which established 48 centers in disadvantaged areas and Bedouin, Druze and Arab villages where basic computer and internet training is provided.

References

Living people
Hebrew University of Jerusalem Faculty of Social Sciences alumni
Israeli businesspeople
Israeli people of Greek-Jewish descent
Israeli philanthropists
1948 births
Recanati family
Jerusalem School of Business Administration alumni